Helmuth Stocker is a West German sprint canoer who competed in the mid to late 1950s. He won two bronze medals in the K-2 10000 m at the ICF Canoe Sprint World Championships, earning them in 1954 and 1958.

References

German male canoeists
Living people
Year of birth missing (living people)
ICF Canoe Sprint World Championships medalists in kayak